The Little Match Girl is a 1928 French drama featurette film directed by Jean Renoir and starring Catherine Hessling.

Plot
The story of a frozen girl who tries to sell matches during Christmas and dreams about a toy store. The film is based on the 1845 short story of the same name by Hans Christian Andersen.

Cast
 Catherine Hessling as Karen 
 Amy Wells as Pop
 Jean Storm as Lieutenant Axel Ott
 Manuel Raaby as Politieagent

See also
 List of Christmas films

References

External links

The Little Match Girl at the Internet Archive

1920s Christmas drama films
1928 films
Films based on The Little Match Girl
Films directed by Jean Renoir
French Christmas drama films
French silent feature films
1920s French-language films
Films set around New Year
French black-and-white films
Featurettes
1928 drama films
Silent drama films
1920s French films